The Ocean Park Conservation Foundation, Hong Kong, often referred to by its initialism OPCFHK is the conglomerate of the former Ocean Park Conservation Foundation (OPCF) and The Hong Kong Society for Panda Conservation (HKSPC) established under the Ocean Park Corporation, with effect from 1 July 2005. It is a registered charitable non-governmental organisation.

Its head office is in Ocean Park Hong Kong in Aberdeen, Southern District.

OPCFHK has not only combined the missions of its forerunners to promote conservation activities for dolphins, whales and giant pandas, but also expanded to other animals such as birds, reptiles and amphibians of Asia. It looks for achieving the wildlife sustainability and biodiversity through advocation, facilitation and participation in the conservation of wildlife and habitats with research and education in Asia.

While primarily funded by Ocean Park Hong Kong, the Foundation is also reliant on other caring corporations and donors to make a real difference in the conservation efforts throughout Asia.

Background 

Whales, dolphins and porpoises (cetaceans) in rivers and coastal waters of Asia face many threats. Without prompt and decisive action, many of them or even some species will likely extinct in the coming decade.

It is acknowledged that few were known about cetaceans and marine mammals in Asia, exposing the needs to learn more to provide the prerequisite for and conservation. Though the situation has been improved, there is still a high possibility for the baiji dolphins (Chinese river dolphin) to go extinct in the decades to come. Our environment is constantly losing its biodiversity with much pollution and overexploitation. Human caused climatic change, toxic chemical build up and energy shortages have even worsen the situation.

Even the population of the giant pandas has increased from 1000 in the 1980s to 1600 recently, their survival is still not optimistic. And apart from the prominent threats to whales, dolphins and giant pandas, many other species are also disappearing at alarming rates.

One recent threat is from a Chytrid fugal infection that has spread through Central America, found in Australia and could easily expand to Asia, killing amphibian populations, which have been dropping for 10 years with environmental degradation and is now facing the possibility of extinction.

History

The former Ocean Park Conservation Foundation 
The Ocean Park Conservation Foundation (OPCF, 海洋公園鯨豚保護基金) was established by the Ocean Park Corporation in October 1993. Its aims were to arouse the public awareness of the problems facing Asian cetaceans and to take actions to protect the Asian ocean.

OPCF had become a registered charitable organisation in 1995. It was combined with HKSPC from 1 July 2005.

The Hong Kong Society for Panda Conservation 

The Hong Kong Society for Panda Conservation (HKSPC, 香港熊貓保育協會) is an independent charitable organisation. Its establishment in March 1999 marked the significance of the arrival of the precious gift from China, a pair of giant pandas named An An (安安) and Jia Jia (佳佳).

The aim of HKSPC is to improve the plight of giant pandas in the wild. The society was supported by the Central Government of the People's Republic of China. Ocean Park Corporation has also given support administratively and financially.

Starting from 1 July 2005, HKSPC joined the former Ocean Park Conservation Foundation to form the current OPCFHK.

Conglomeration of OPCF and HKSPC 

Cooperation between zoos and aquariums towards prominent leadership in wildlife and habitat conservation is critical in the 21st century, for the world is now in an era of rising environmental threats, climate change and shrinking biodiversity. Zoos and aquariums are in the position to offer more significant contributions to the international response to crises through their fieldwork and research, and through educating more than 600 million annual visitors. Strategic co-operation will remove barriers for global conservation efforts and strengthen the ability of zoos and aquariums to promote proper animal management practices, conservation of wild population, field projects and public education.

Being a more resourceful single conservation foundation, utilisation of marketing resources to promote conservation work, and collaboration of efforts towards zero extinction and sustainable use of natural resources by the new OPCFHK are made possible. With the joint resources from the two old organisations, more are dedicated to investigation of the non-charismatic megafauna in addition to the emphasis on charismatic megafauna as the umbrella species to save wildlife habitats.

More efficient conservation and better prospect to save other critical taxon and the ecosystem as a whole are given the green light under the conglomeration.

Organization structure 
The Foundation's activities are currently led by the Foundation Director, supervised by a board of trustees and an eight-member Scientific Advisory Committee. It has two full-time paid staff, and they are assisted by a team of part-time staff members as well as volunteers.

The foundation has been co-operating with other Non-governmental organisations(NGOs), such as the IUCN/SSC Cetacean Specialist Group , Wildlife Conservation Society , the World Wide Fund for Nature (世界保育基金會) and the University of Hong Kong's Swire Institute of Marine Science (香港大學太古海洋科學研究所), to better realise its mission.

Research and projects 
OPCFHK (and the former OPCF) has launched a number of studies and projects on wildlife animals including marine mammals and animals on land. Environmental conservation is one of the areas with which they are concerned. 
They have also actively organised various education programmes and public awareness projects.

Research on dolphins 
Apart from trying to save endangered dolphins in the Yangtze River, OPCF has also conducted a detailed research study of Indo-Pacific humpback dolphins in Hong Kong. Moreover, OPCF has funded a study of conservation status of humpback dolphins in Xiamen (廈門), PRC.

Other research studies include: Irrawaddy dolphins in northern Borneo, Malaysia and Mahakam River and lakes in East Kalimantan, Indonesia. 
In addition, a new action plan has been developed for the coming five years for dolphins in Gulf of Tonkin in Vietnam and China.

A special issue of Asian Marine Biology focusing on Asian whales, dolphins and porpoises was published by OPCF.

Research on the status of cetaceans in the Gulf of Tonkin

OPCF has conducted a project to investigate the status of cetaceans in the Gulf of Tonkin from October 1999 to April 2000. This programme was sponsored by International Union for Conservation of Nature and Natural Resources (IUCN) Species Survival Commission Cetacean Specialist Group with donations from Convention on Migration Species.
This research has generated meaningful information on the distribution and abundance of cetaceans in the Gulf of Tonkin. It shows the distribution and density of fishing vessels and the frequency and nature of accidental and intentional cetaceans catches.

Projects on horseshoe crabs 

Horseshoe crabs are not real crabs, but more closely related to spiders or scorpions. The horseshoe crabs have been swimming in the Earth's waters for 400 million years. Although they are not in the endangered species list, their numbers are dropping to be in the extinction list.  City University of Hong Kong has conducted a study on the horseshoe crabs in Hong Kong. the result shows that nowadays only 1 or 2 crabs can be found in every , a decrease of 90% in four years when compared to 10 to 20 in 2002.

The biggest threat to the horseshoe crabs' population is from pollution and the development of the city's shorelines, which are destroying the ground for the creature to lay eggs and breed.

In the light of this, OPCFHK have offered funding of 5 million dollars in 2006–2007 to save marine animals and horseshoe crabs and been working on an improvement project on life-maintaining facilities for infant horseshoe crabs before they are put into the wild. To arouse concerns from the public, education events are held within Hong Kong's territories on the background, ecology and conservation issues of horseshoe crabs.

Satellite tracking of the Yangtze finless porpoise 

The Yangtze finless porpoise is listed as a First Class Protected Animal in China. OPCF had sponsored a study from August 1999 to May 2000 to track the finless porpoise's movement for 3 to 6 months using satellite.  Data gathered are used to analyse their group structure, seasonal movement patterns, habitat requirements and social behaviour. This will help improve the finless porpoise conservation programmes.

Research on other marine mammals  

Instead of focusing only on helping the dolphins, OPCF has also funded scientific projects in various aspects.  For example, it funded the standing networks establishment in China between 2002 and 2003, mainly along its southern and northern coast, aiming at helping other injured or sicked marine mammals.  It has funded other organisations globally in doing research, too.

Research on giant pandas 

Due to deforestation for agricultural landuse, the pandas are forced to migrate high up to the mountains. In the last two decades, the area of pandas' habitat has dropped by 50%. Now their habitat occupies only a total area of 14,000 km2, where they have a low reproductive rate.

Institutional policies to protect the giant panda population:
Government enforced policies to stop the development of forest area in China.
Bamboo corridors were designed to link up fragmented forest areas.
Artificial insemination has proven successful to breed giant pandas. Institutes in China, for instance, the China Research and Conservation Centre for the giant panda, Wolong (卧龍) and the Chengdu (成都) Research base of giant panda Breeding have successfully breed many giant pandas' infants.
As some of the people living in this forest are usually poor and rely on the pandas' habitat areas for food, the conservation program is designed to help improve the livelihood of those people, and educate them to protect the natural reserves for the pandas.

Projects on planting mangrove 

Mangrove plants play an important role in maintaining the stability and ecological balance of coastal ecosystems, but they have been destroyed in the past due to reclamation and infrastructure development in Hong Kong. With regard to this, OPCF launched a Mangrove Planting Day with the Agriculture, Fisheries and Conservation Department on 6 May 2000 to conserve mangroves in Hong Kong. Mangroves were planted in Kei Ling Ha Lo Wai, Sai Kung by helpers from Scout Association of Hong Kong (香港童軍總會) and OPCF volunteers.

International Coastal Cleanup (ICC) 
A campaign jointly organised by OPCFHK and Ocean Park's Environmental Steering Committee. Over 750 pounds of refuse was collected by around 80 participants on 7 October 2006.

University Sponsorship Programme 2005–06 

Eight students from the department of Ecology and Biodiversity of the University of Hong Kong conducted researches on giant pandas and white-flag dolphin sponsored by OPCFHK. They participated in four different field research projects recently. The four projects included studying:
the endangered Chinese white dolphins in Guangxi (廣西)
the ecosystem of the Defending Nature Reserve in Sichuan (四川) province
the number of finless porpoise and white-flag dolphin population in Poyang Lake (鄱陽湖) of China
giant pandas using enrichment items designed by students to stimulate giant pandas mentally and physically

Allocation of funds 
Raised funds are generally allocated to three different aspects:
 Ecological and behavioural researches on the cetaceans, giant pandas, birds, reptiles, amphibians and other wildlife of Asia;
 Researches on captive animals and any aspects of their behaviour and husbandry;
 Projects, workshops and conferences related to education, conservation and ecotourism.

In 2005–2007, OPCFHK had donated 10 percent of its scientific research funding to study the impact of South Asian tsunami disaster on the marine environment, and to help rebuild damaged corals.
"The tsunami tragedy has left the coastal regions of South Asia in massive need of reconstruction," Nora Tam, trustee chair of OPCFHK, said.
"In our efforts to conserve, we need to rebuild the coral reefs and fragile coastal ecosystems so that the environment is better than before for both animals and human communities to thrive," Tam said.

From November 2005 to January 2006, the Foundation has sponsored six Hong Kong University students to conduct research projects, giving them a chance to experience a real-life conservation job in the field.

See also 
Hulu Concept

References

External links 
Official Website
Ocean Park Hong Kong (香港海洋公園)

Environmental organisations based in Hong Kong
2005 establishments in Hong Kong